Hamilton Gallery is a public art gallery in the regional town of Hamilton, Victoria, Australia.

Hamilton Gallery's collection features gouache and watercolour pictures by English landscape painter Paul Sandby (1731–1809).

The Gallery's collection also includes items of rare ancient Grecian pottery and ancient Roman glass. There is also a collection of rare oriental art.

The gallery is a member of the Public Galleries Association of Victoria.

References

External links
 Hamilton Gallery website

Art museums and galleries in Victoria (Australia)